Subaru of America, Inc. (commonly known as SOA), based in Camden, New Jersey, is the United States-based distributor of Subaru's brand vehicles.  SOA is a subsidiary of Subaru Corporation of Japan. The company markets and distributes Subaru vehicles, parts and accessories through a network of more than 600 dealers throughout the United States.  SOA also plays a minor role in the design of vehicles for the U.S. market, working with Subaru Corporation and Subaru Research and Development to help convey American consumer preferences.  

In 1967, Malcolm Bricklin approached Subaru with the idea of bringing the tiny Subaru 360 to the United States.  After a great deal of regulatory red tape and negotiation, Bricklin made a deal with Subaru. Bricklin formed Subaru of America, Inc. to sell Subaru franchises and later brought in Harvey Lamm as the COO.

Subaru of America established the Eastern Division in 1968 in Bala Cynwyd, Pennsylvania at 555 City Line Avenue, and the Western Division at 1000 West Coast Hwy, Newport Beach, California. The headquarters later moved to Pennsauken, New Jersey and then Cherry Hill, New Jersey. In 1986, it was fully acquired by Fuji Heavy Industries (now named Subaru Corporation).

In 1989, Fuji Heavy Industries and then-partner Isuzu opened a joint factory in Lafayette, Indiana, called Subaru-Isuzu Automotive, Inc., or SIA, which initially manufactured the Subaru Legacy and Isuzu Rodeo. In 2001, Isuzu sold its stake in the plant to FHI for $1 due to flagging sales and it was renamed Subaru of Indiana Automotive, Inc. SIA has been designated a backyard wildlife Habitat by the National Wildlife Federation, and has achieved a zero-landfill production designation.  SOA is SIA's largest customer, being the sole distributor in the United States for SIA produced vehicles, although SIA also ships vehicles to Canada and various other countries for sale by other Subaru Affiliates and independent distributors.  SOA also utilizes SIA's two mile test track and off-road course for dealer incentive programs and training.

Subaru built a new 250,000 square foot headquarters in Camden, New Jersey and relocated there in 2018. In May 2019 demolition started on the previous Subaru building in Cherry Hill.

Products 
Subaru cars available in the United States, which are sold by SOA:

Present models
 Subaru Legacy 1990–present
 Subaru Impreza 1993–present
Subaru Impreza WRX (now known simply as WRX) 2002–present
 Subaru Outback 1996–present
 Subaru Forester 1997–present
 Subaru BRZ 2013–present 
 Subaru Crosstrek 2013–present
 Subaru Ascent 2019–present
 Subaru Solterra 2022–present

Past models
 Subaru 360 1968–1970
 Subaru 1100 1971
 Subaru 1300 1972
 Subaru 1400 1973–1976
 Subaru 1600 1977–1979
 Subaru BRAT 1978–1987
 Subaru DL/GL 1980–1989
 Subaru XT 1985–1991
 Subaru Justy 1987–1994
 Subaru Loyale 1990–1994
 Subaru SVX 1992–1997
 Subaru Baja 2003–2006
 Subaru Tribeca 2006–2014
 Subaru Impreza WRX STI (later known simply as WRX STI) 2004–2021

Motorsports 
With the rise of rally racing, and the import scene in the U.S., the introduction of the highly anticipated Subaru Impreza WRX in 2001 was successful in bringing high performance, AWD compact cars into the sports car mainstream. Subaru supplies a factory-backed team for Rally America, and has won the driver's title in five of the seasons.

Starting in 2006, Subaru of America sponsored the Subaru Road Racing Team (SRRT) with a Subaru Legacy 2.5 GT Spec-B in the Grand-Am Street Tuner class. In 2010, SRRT campaigns a WRX STI in the Grand Sport class.

See also 
 Subaru
 Subaru Industrial Power Products
 Subaru of Indiana Automotive
 Subaru Park, a soccer stadium near Philadelphia sponsored by Subaru of America
 Toyota Motor Sales, U.S.A., Inc.

References

External links 
 Subaru of America official site
 Subaru Global official site

Car manufacturers of the United States
Companies based in Camden, New Jersey
Subaru
Vehicle manufacturing companies established in 1968
1968 establishments in Pennsylvania
American subsidiaries of foreign companies